Narak Tegapu is an association football club from Vanuatu.

In 2014 Narak Tegapu were champions of the TVL First Division and they were promoted to the Port Vila Premier League, appearing in the 2014–15 Port Vila Premier League season. However, the club finished at the bottom of the table, and were thus relegated to the TVL First Division at the end of the season. As of 2017, the club plays in the Port Vila Second Division, the third and bottom tier of the Port Vila football league system.

Current squad

Honours
TVL First Division
Winner (1): 2013–14

References

Football clubs in Vanuatu
Port Vila